Don Holder (September 29, 1928 – September 1, 2015) was an American gymnast. He competed in eight events at the 1952 Summer Olympics.

Raised in Jersey City, New Jersey, Holder attended William L. Dickinson High School, graduating in 1946, before attending Florida State University, where he was chosen to serve as co-captain of the gymnastics team.

References

1928 births
2015 deaths
American male artistic gymnasts
Olympic gymnasts of the United States
Gymnasts at the 1952 Summer Olympics
Sportspeople from Jersey City, New Jersey
William L. Dickinson High School alumni
Pan American Games medalists in gymnastics
Pan American Games gold medalists for the United States
Pan American Games silver medalists for the United States
Gymnasts at the 1955 Pan American Games
20th-century American people